Cutter is a census-designated place in Gila County in the U.S. state of Arizona.  Cutter  is located just off  US Route 70, east of the city of Globe.  The population as of the 2010 U.S. Census was 74.

Geography

Demographics

References

Census-designated places in Gila County, Arizona